Mohammad Abualnadi (born February 8, 2001) is an American and Jordanian soccer player who plays as a defender for Sporting Kansas City II.

References

External links
 Pittsburgh bio

2001 births
Living people
American people of Jordanian descent
American men's soccer players
Association football defenders
Jordanian footballers
Notre Dame Fighting Irish men's soccer players
Sportspeople from Overland Park, Kansas
Soccer players from Kansas
Sporting Kansas City II players
USL Championship players
Jordanian expatriate footballers
Jordanian expatriate sportspeople in the United States
Expatriate soccer players in the United States
Jordan youth international footballers
Pittsburgh Panthers men's soccer players